Sainte-Marie-Salomé is a municipality in the Lanaudière region of Quebec, Canada, part of the Montcalm Regional County Municipality.

History
In 1765, the first wave of colonization occurred as a result of the Great Upheaval when Acadians from Boston arrived and settled on the south bank of the Vacher Creek in the Seignory of Saint-Sulpice. The settlement was called Bas-du-Ruisseau-Vacher (meaning "Lower Vacher Creek"), named after a certain Vacher who accompanied surveyor John Péladeau in 1767 on the seignory's territory. In 1790, the settlement grew when families from Château-Richer arrived. Actual clearing of the area began around 1820.

In March 1883, Sainte-Marie-Salomé became home to the second creamery of Quebec.

In 1888, the parish municipality of Sainte-Marie-Salomé was established by separating from Saint-Jacques-de-l'Achigan, and named after Mary Salome. Its letters patent used the misspelled "Salomée", which was not corrected until 1986. In 1889, the local post office opened. During the 1890s, the location was also known as Sainte-Marie-Salomé-de-Port-Royal, indicating the origin of its Acadian settlers.

Administration 
 1995-2013: Maurice Richard
 2013- : Véronique Venne

Economy
Being in the fertile land of the St. Lawrence Lowlands, agriculture is the most important economic function of the municipality.

Demographics
Population trend:
 Population in 2011: 1164 (2006 to 2011 population change: -7.3%)
 Population in 2006: 1256
 Population in 2001: 1166
 Population in 1996: 1189
 Population in 1991: 1116

Private dwellings occupied by usual residents: 474 (total dwellings: 508)

Mother tongue:
 English as first language: 0.8%
 French as first language: 97.6%
 English and French as first language: 0.8%
 Other as first language: 0.8%

Education

Commission scolaire des Samares operates francophone public schools, including:
 École de Sainte-Marie-Salomé

The Sir Wilfrid Laurier School Board operates anglophone public schools, including:
 Joliette Elementary School in Saint-Charles-Borromée
 Joliette High School in Joliette

References

External links
 MRC de Montcalm - Sainte-Marie-Salomé

Municipalities in Quebec
Incorporated places in Lanaudière